The bilabial nasal click is a click consonant found in some of the languages of southern Africa.

Features

Features of the bilabial nasal click:

Occurrence
Bilabial nasal clicks only occur in the Tuu and Kx'a families of southern Africa, in the Australian ritual language Damin, and for /mw/ in some of the languages neighboring Shona, such as at least for some speakers of Ndau and Tonga.

Glottalized bilabial nasal click

The Tuu and Kx'a languages also have glottalized nasal clicks. These are formed by closing the glottis so that the click is pronounced in silence; however, any preceding vowel will be nasalized.

Notes

Bilabial consonants
Click consonants
Nasal consonants
Voiced consonants